Alexandru Prigorschi is a diplomat from the Republic of Moldova. He is the Moldovan Ambassador to Bulgaria.

References

Living people
Ambassadors of Moldova to Bulgaria
Year of birth missing (living people)